Chula Vista, California is a city in Southern California.

Chula Vista may also refer to:

Chula Vista (Missouri), a summit in Missouri
Chula Vista, Texas (disambiguation), several places

See also
Chula Vista Isles